Amity Township may refer to:

Amity Township, Berks County, Pennsylvania
Amity Township, Erie County, Pennsylvania

See also 
Amity Township (disambiguation)

Pennsylvania township disambiguation pages